George Udny Yule FRS (18 February 1871 – 26 June 1951), usually known as Udny Yule, was a British statistician, particularly known for the Yule distribution and proposing the preferential attachment model for random graphs.

Personal life

Yule was born at Beech Hill, a house in Morham near Haddington, Scotland and died in Cambridge, England. He came from an established Scottish family composed of army officers, civil servants, scholars, and administrators. His father, Sir George Udny Yule (1813–1886) was a brother of the noted orientalist Sir Henry Yule (1820–1889). His great uncle was the botanist John Yule.

In 1899, Yule married May Winifred Cummings. The marriage was annulled in 1912, producing no children.

Education and teaching 
Udny Yule was educated at Winchester College and at the age of 16 at University College London where he read engineering. After a year in Bonn doing research in experimental physics under Heinrich Rudolf Hertz, Yule returned to University College in 1893 to work as a demonstrator for Karl Pearson, one of his former teachers. Pearson was beginning to work in statistics and Yule followed him into this new field. Yule progressed to an assistant professorship but he left in 1899 to a better-paid position as secretary to an examination board, working under Philip Magnus at the City and Guilds Institute.

In 1902 Yule became Newmarch lecturer in statistics at University College, a position he held together with his post at the City and Guilds Institute. He continued to publish articles and also wrote an influential textbook, Introduction to the Theory of Statistics (1911), based on his lectures.

In 1912 Yule moved to Cambridge University to a newly created Lectureship in Statistics and he remained in Cambridge for the rest of his life. During the First World War Yule worked for the army and then for the Ministry of Food. A heart attack in 1931 left him semi-invalided and led to his early retirement. His flow of publications almost ceased but, in the 1940s he found new interests, one of which led to a book, The Statistical Study of Literary Vocabulary.

Scholarship 
Yule was a prolific writer, the highlight of his publications being perhaps the textbook Introduction to the Theory of Statistics, which went through fourteen editions and was published in several languages. He was active in the Royal Statistical Society, was awarded its Guy Medal in Gold in 1911, and served as its president in 1924–26.

Yule's first paper on statistics appeared in 1895: "On the Correlation of Total Pauperism with Proportion of Out-relief". Yule was interested in applying statistical techniques to social problems and he quickly became a member of the Royal Statistical Society. For many years the only members interested in mathematical statistics were Yule, Edgeworth and Bowley. In 1897–99 Yule wrote important papers on correlation and regression. After 1900 he worked on a parallel theory of association. His approach to association was quite different from Pearson's and relations between them deteriorated. Yule had broad interests and his collaborators included the agricultural meteorologist R. H. Hooker, the medical statistician Major Greenwood and the agricultural scientist Sir Frank Engledow. Yule's sympathy towards the newly rediscovered Mendelian theory of genetics led to several papers.

In the 1920s Yule wrote three influential papers on time series analysis, "On the time-correlation problem" (1921), a critique of the variate difference method, an investigation of a form of spurious correlation (1926) and "On a Method of Investigating Periodicities in Disturbed Series, with Special Reference to Wolfer's Sunspot Numbers" (1927), which used an autoregressive model to model the sunspot time series instead of the established periodogram method of Schuster.

In 1925 Yule published the paper "A Mathematical Theory of Evolution, based on the Conclusions of Dr. J. C. Willis, F.R.S.", where he proposes a stochastic process that leads to a distribution with a power-law tail – in this case, the distribution of species and genera.
This was later called the Yule process, but is now better known as preferential attachment.
Herbert A. Simon dubbed the resulting distribution the Yule distribution in his honour.

Assessment 
Frank Yates culminated his 1952 obituary of Yule by saying:
“To summarize we may, I think, justly conclude that though Yule did not fully develop any completely new branches of statistical theory, he took the first steps in many directions which were later to prove fruitful lines for further progress… He can indeed rightly claim to be one of the pioneers of modern statistics”.

Yule made important contributions to the theory and practice of correlation, regression, and association, as well as to time series analysis. He pioneered the use of preferential attachment stochastic processes to explain the origin of power law distribution. The Yule distribution, a discrete power law, is named after him.

Although Yule taught at Cambridge for twenty years, he had little impact on the development of statistics there. M. S. Bartlett recalled him as a "mentor" but his famous association with Maurice Kendall, who revised the Introduction to the Theory of Statistics, only came about after Kendall had graduated.

Selected works

 
 
 
 
 
 Yule, G. Udny. Introduction to the Theory of Statistics London Griffin 1911.

References

External links
 
Royal Society citation

George Udny Yule: Statistical Scientist
Portrait

1871 births
1951 deaths
People from Haddington, East Lothian
19th-century British mathematicians
20th-century British mathematicians
Anglo-Scots
British statisticians
Alumni of University College London
Academics of University College London
People educated at Winchester College
Presidents of the Royal Statistical Society
Fellows of the Royal Society
Mathematical statisticians